HMS Eaglet is a stone frigate of the Royal Navy in Liverpool, Merseyside. The base is the home to a number of units, including: Royal Naval Reserve, Royal Marines Reserve Merseyside, Naval Regional Command Northern England, Liverpool URNU, Sea Cadet Corps, and the Liverpool Royal Navy and Royal Marines Careers Office.

From 1904 to 1918 it operated under the name HMS Eagle.

Current
The current stone frigate is based on Brunswick Dock in Liverpool, opened in 1998 by the Duke of Edinburgh. As outlined above it is also home to several other functions and units in addition to the reservists of HMS Eaglet.

History
This history of the Royal Navy, training and reserves in Merseyside is a long one. There has been a reserves training unit commissioned in Liverpool since 1904, then Mersey Division RNVR.
Much of the unit's history has been afloat, with various ships taking up the mantle of HMS Eagle and later Eaglet to engage with the maritime element of training as well as drawing recruitment to itself and sub-units (now defunct) to engage with the region. In 2018 HMS Eaglet celebrated her centenary.

Mersey Division was mobilised in 1914 to form part of the Royal Naval Division, serving at Gallipoli, the battles of Battle of Vimy Ridge, Passchendaele and Cambrai.

To avoid confusion with a newer , the frigate was renamed HMS Eaglet in 1918.  The ship was destroyed in a fire in 1926, and replaced by the First World War  sloop , which was renamed Eaglet. The new Eaglet was berthed at Salthouse Dock. During the Second World War, Eaglet became the flagship of Commander-in-Chief Western Approaches. In 1971, the sloop was scrapped and HMS Eaglet moved ashore to a new HQ at Prince's Dock. In 1993, Eaglet received the freedom of the city of Liverpool.

Current units
The following are based at the location:

 Headquarters, Naval Regional Command Northern England
 Naval Regional Commander, Northern England and Isle of Man
 Headquarters, Royal Marine Reserve Merseyside
 Liverpool University Royal Naval Unit
 s:
  – serving Manchester and Salford University Royal Naval Unit
  – serving Liverpool University Royal Naval Unit

Famous attendees
Ian Edward Fraser, VC RNR

References

 
Evans, B. (2003). HMS Eaglet; The Story Of The Royal Naval Reserves On Merseyside. Countyvise Publishing. .

External links
HMS Eaglet, Royal Navy 
RMR Merseyside, Royal Navy 

 

Royal Navy shore establishments
Military installations established in 1904
Buildings and structures in Liverpool
Military history of Liverpool